Ronald Anthony George (14 August 1922 – October 1989) was an English professional footballer. He played for Crystal Palace and Colchester United between 1948 and 1955, making 127 appearances in the Football League.

Biography
Born in Bristol in 1922, George played for Western League club Bristol Aeroplane Company before being signed by Crystal Palace in February 1947. He played 122 league matches for Palace (two goals) during six years at the club, before signing for Colchester on 16 January 1954. After playing only five matches for Colchester, he left the club on 5 February 1955, and signed for Sudbury Town.

He died in October 1989 in Colchester.

References

External links
 Ron George at Colchester United Archive Database
 Ron George at Holmesdale.net

1922 births
1989 deaths
Footballers from Bristol
English footballers
Association football defenders
Bristol Aeroplane Company F.C. players
Crystal Palace F.C. players
Colchester United F.C. players
Sudbury Town F.C. players